Vireo is a genus of small passerine birds restricted to the New World. Vireos typically have dull greenish plumage (hence the name, from Latin virere, "to be green"), but some are brown or gray on the back and some have bright yellow underparts. They resemble wood warblers apart from their slightly larger size and heavier bills, which in most species have a very small hook at the tip. The legs are stout.

Most species fall into two plumage groups: one with wing bars and yellow or white eye rings, and one with unmarked wings and eye stripes; however, the Chocó vireo has both wing bars and eye stripes.

Sexes are alike in all species except for the black-capped vireo, in which the male's crown is black and the female's is gray.

Taxonomy
The genus Vireo was introduced in 1808 by the French ornithologist Louis Jean Pierre Vieillot. The type species was subsequently designated as the white-eyed vireo (Vireo griseus) by  German ornithologist Hans Friedrich Gadow in 1883. The word vireo was used by Latin authors for a small, green, migratory bird, probably a Eurasian golden oriole, but a European greenfinch has also been suggested.

Feeding
All members of the genus mostly eat insects and other arthropods, but also eat some fruit. A common pattern is arthropods in summer and fruit in winter. Vireos take prey from leaves and branches and in midair, and the gray vireo takes 5% of its prey from the ground.

Range and territorial behavior
Most species are found in Central America and northern South America. Thirteen species occur farther north, in the United States, Canada, and Bermuda; of these, all but Hutton's vireo are migratory. Vireos seldom fly long distances except in migration.

The resident species occur in pairs or family groups that maintain territories all year (except Hutton's vireo, which joins mixed feeding flocks). Most of the migrants defend winter territories against conspecifics. The exceptions are the complex comprising the red-eyed vireo, the yellow-green vireo, the black-whiskered vireo, and the Yucatan vireo, which winter in small, wandering flocks.

Voice and breeding
Males of most species are persistent singers. Songs are usually rather simple, ranging from monotonous, in some species of the Caribbean littoral and islands, to elaborate and pleasant to human ears in the Chocó vireo. Calls often include "scolding chatters and mews".

The species whose nests are known all build a cup-shaped nest that hangs from branches. Its outer layer is made of coarse leaf and bark strips or of moss, depending on the species; in either case, the material is bound with spider silk and ornamented with spider egg cases. The lining is made of fine grass stems neatly circling the cup. In most species, both sexes work on the nest, but the female adds the lining. In the red-eyed, black-whiskered, Yucatan, and Philadelphia vireos, the male does not help, instead singing and accompanying the female while she builds the nest. The female does most of the incubation, spelled by the male except in the red-eyed vireo complex.

The eggs are whitish; all but the black-capped and dwarf vireos have sparse, fine brown or red-brown spots at the wide end. Tropical species lay two, while temperate-zone species lay four or five. Incubation lasts 11 to 13 days, and the young fledge after the same amount of time. Both sexes feed the nestlings arthropods, and each fledgeling is fed by one parent or the other (not both) for as long as 20 days.

Species
The genus contains 34 species:

References

External links

 
Bird genera
Taxa named by Louis Jean Pierre Vieillot